is a Japanese football coach who is the manager of the Myanmar women's national football team.

Coaching career
Coaching a host of teams in his native Japan and retiring as a player aged 28, Yoshinori was chosen to manage the Myanmar women's national football team in 2011, leading them at the 2011 AFF Women's Championship.

Leading Myanmar to a 5–0 win over Laos in the opening fixture of the 2013 AFF Women's Championship and guiding them to the semi-final of the tournament, Yoshinori claimed the 2013 Women's AFF Coach of the Year Award. He helped Myanmar qualify for the 2014 Asian Cup through an unbeaten record in the qualifying stage where they conceded zero goals. He cited teamwork to their success.

He submitted a complaint to the Asian Football Confederation for the reportedly poor officiating of Indian referee Maria Rebello in a 2–2 draw with Thailand at the semi-final of the 2013 SEA Games.

He left the post of the coach of Myanmar in December 2019.

References 

1961 births
Sportspeople from Fukushima Prefecture
Expatriate football managers in Myanmar
Japanese footballers
Japanese football managers
Living people
Association footballers not categorized by position